Goronwy Owen (1 January 1723 – July 1769) was one of the 18th century's most notable Welsh poets. He mastered the 24 traditional bardic metres and, although forced by circumstances into exile, played an important role in the literary and antiquarian movement in Wales often described as the Welsh 18th-century Renaissance.

Life
Owen was born on New Year's Day, 1723, in the parish of Llanfair Mathafarn Eithaf in Anglesey. During his childhood he lived at his ancestral home, "Y Dafarn Goch". He was later educated at Friars School, Bangor, and Jesus College, Oxford, although he did not remain long at the college. He was admitted to the college as a servitor on 3 June 1742 but, whilst his name remained on the college's books until March 1748 (albeit with some omissions), he only resided in the college for about one week in the Midsummer Term of 1744 and incurred a debt of 15s 1d which was never paid.

In January 1746 he was ordained and served for a time as curate of St Mary's Church, Llanfair Mathafarn Eithaf. As a young man, he left Anglesey for the last time, wandering to Denbighshire; to Oswestry where he was made a master at Oswestry School and curate of nearby Selattyn in 1746; he was master of the grammar school at Donnington and curate of nearby Uppington close to Shrewsbury from 1748 to 1753; he then moved to Walton, Liverpool and then to Northolt, Middlesex. In November 1757, he emigrated, together with his young family, to take a post at the College of William & Mary, at Williamsburg, in the Colony of Virginia.

Rev. Owen began teaching about 9 April 1758 and was, in all probability, professor of Latin. Before the end of the first summer he had married Mrs. Clayton, sister of the college president, but she died within the year. He resigned from the college and on 25 August 1760 applied to become Vicar of St. Andrew's Episcopal Church, at Lawrenceville, Brunswick County, Virginia, to which he was appointed a year later and where he remained for the rest of his life. In 1761, he bought a tobacco and cotton plantation, and in 1763 married Joan Simmonds, his third wife. He died early in July 1769, and was buried on his plantation.

Work
Following his emigration, Rev. Owen was most noted as an émigré bard, writing with hiraeth ("longing") for his native district in Anglesey.

He learnt much of his poetic craft from Lewis Morris, a fellow Anglesey man who, with his brothers and others, was a key figure in the Welsh literary circle referred to by Saunders Lewis as a "school of Welsh Augustans".

During the 1790s revival of the Eisteddfod tradition under the patronage of the London-based Gwyneddigion Society, the Gwyneddigion reacted to centuries of incomprehensible Welsh poetry composed in strict meter by holding up the poetry of Rev. Goronwy Owen as a far better model for the poets competing at future Eisteddfodau.

Rev. Owen had often expressed the desire to compose an epic work of Christian poetry which would be the equal of John Milton's Paradise Lost. Rev. Owen felt, however, that the rules of Welsh poetry in strict meter prevented him from doing so. Therefore, by holding Rev. Owen up as a model, the Gwyneddigion ensured that his literary legacy is that, as late as 1930, both the adjudicators and the poets composing submissions to the National Eisteddfod of Wales were aspiring to produce the Welsh national epic that Rev. Owen had longed to write in vain.

According to Eisteddfod historian Hywel Teifi Edwards, however, a Welsh national epic never materialized.

The town of Benllech in Anglesey named its village hall and its primary school, Ysgol Goronwy Owen, in his honour.

Bibliography

Published works
Dewisol Ganiadau yr Oes Hon (1759). ("Selected songs of this age") Anthology. Includes a few of his poems.
Diddanwch Teuluaidd (1763, 1817). ("A seemly diversion") Anthology in three parts. Includes most of his poems together with works by Lewis Morris and Huw Huws.
Corph y Gainc (1810). Selections.
John Jones (ed.), Gronoviana (Llanrwst, 1860). Complete poems and a selection of literary correspondence.
Rev. Robert Jones (ed.), Poetical Works of Goronwy Owen (1876).
Isaac Foulkes (ed.), Holl Waith Barddonol Goronwy Owen (1878). Complete poems.
Isaac Foulkes (ed.), Gwaith Goronwy Owen (1902). Essentially a new edition of the above.
W. J. Gruffydd (ed.), Cywyddau Goronwy Owen (1907). Annotated edition of the poems.
J.H. Davies (ed.), The Letters of Goronwy Owen (1924).
Dafydd Wyn Wiliam (ed.), Llythyrau Goronwy Owen (The Letters of Goronwy Owen) (2014). Annotated edition of the Letters.

Individual poems have also been published in numerous anthologies and other sources, including The Oxford Book of Welsh Verse.

Biographies and studies
Bedwyr Lewis Jones, in Gwŷr Môn (1979), ed. Bedwyr Lewis Jones, Cyngor Gwlad Gwynedd. 
Alan Llwyd, Goronwy Ddiafael, Goronwy Ddu. Cofiant Goronwy Owen 1723-1769 (Cyhoeddiadau Barddas, 1997).
W.D. Williams, Goronwy Owen (Cardiff, 1951).

References

External links

Welsh Biography Online
Cywydd Hiraeth
Brunswick County Story

1723 births
1769 deaths
18th-century American Episcopalians
18th-century American poets
18th-century Welsh poets
Alumni of Jesus College, Oxford
American poetry in immigrant languages
Anglican poets
British emigrants to the Thirteen Colonies
College of William & Mary faculty
Colonial American poets
Freemasons of the Premier Grand Lodge of England
People educated at Friars School, Bangor
People educated at Oswestry School
People from Anglesey
People from Brunswick County, Virginia
Poet priests
Poets from Virginia
Religious leaders from Virginia
Virginia colonial people
Virginia pioneers
Welsh-American culture in Virginia
Welsh-American history
Welsh emigrants to the United States
Welsh-language poets
Welsh poets